Jagger Jesse Eaton (born February 21, 2001) is an American professional skateboarder who currently competes in street and park competitions. He was the youngest ever X Games competitor at age 11, until his record was broken in 2019. In 2021, Eaton won the first Olympic skateboarding medal, earning a bronze in the men's street competition in Tokyo, Japan.

Early life
Eaton and his brother Jett (two years his senior) are the sons of Geoff Eaton, owner of the Kids That Rip (KTR) Skateboard School, a school that trains a number of junior X Games competitors. Both brothers started skateboarding under their father's tutelage at a young age, with Eaton commencing at four years of age. He is the son of Shelly Schaerer, a member of the United States national gymnastics team from 1985–1989.

Career
Along with his brother Jett and fellow junior skater Tom Schaar, Eaton was sponsored by DC Shoes as part of their 2012 initiative, the "DC Youth Division". Transworld Skateboarding magazine's Blair Alley called the brothers "the future of vert skating".

Eaton was featured in the Esquire Magazine: Life of Man 80th Anniversary edition that was published in October 2013.

A number of regular skateboarding commentators have been critical of Eaton's participation at professional-level skateboarding events, including Bob Burnquist who believes that separate junior divisions should be established for competitions. David Daniels of Bleacher Report suggested that Eaton's entry (and that of others his age) in professional competitions harms the credibility of skateboarding in the sporting context.

Eaton appeared on episodes of Rob Dyrdek's Fantasy Factory and Ridiculousness that aired in January 2015. A reality TV series named Jagger Eaton's Mega Life aired in September 2016 on Nickelodeon. He also appeared on the September 13th Episode of WWE SmackDown in a backstage segment with The Miz.

Sponsors
As of December 2022, Eaton is sponsored by Cariuma Shoes, The Heart Supply Skateboards, Red Bull, Bones Wheels, Independent Truck Company, Mob Griptape and KTR Skateboard School.

Competition history
At age 11, Eaton competed at the 2012 X Games in Los Angeles, United States, becoming the youngest ever X Games competitor breaking the record set by Nyjah Huston at the 2006 Games (Gui Khury later broke Eaton's record at the 2019 X Games, competing at the age of 10 years, 7 months). The previous year, Eaton had competed at Bob Burnquist's Dreamland MegaRamp Invitational and tied for 3rd place in the amateur division.

In December 2014, Eaton won Tampa Am, in Tampa, Florida, U.S. Aged 13, he is one of the youngest skateboarders to win the competition.

In February 2015, Eaton won the BoardrAm, in Houston, Texas, U.S.  This win earned Eaton an invitation to the BoardrAm finals at the X Games 2015 in Austin, Texas.

In July 2021, Eaton won the bronze medal for the United States in Men’s Street Skateboarding at the 2020 Olympic Games in Tokyo, Japan.

2012
X Games, Los Angeles
Big Air – 12th place

2013
Global X Games, Munich
Big Air – 4th place
Global X Games, Barcelona
Big Air – 6th place
X Games, Los Angeles
Big Air – 4th place
Kimberly Diamond Cup, South Africa
Vert and Big Air (combined) Competition – 8th place (Vert) and equal 2nd place (Big Air) 
Street Competition – 17th place
Big Air Best Trick Gap Competition – 1st place

2014
Tampa AM

Street – 1st place

2015
BoardAm
Street – 1st place

2016

 X Games Austin
 Street Am – 3rd place

2017

 X Games Minneapolis
 Street Am – 1st place

2018
Tampa Pro
1st place

X Games Norway
Street – 2nd place

 X Games Minneapolis
 Street – 2nd place

2019
X Games Minneapolis
Park - 2nd place

2021
 Tokyo Olympic Games – USA Skateboarding Team
Street –  Bronze
 SLS Super Crown World Championship
Street – 1st place

2022
X Games Chiba
Park - 1nd place

Filmography

References

External links
 Profile at Dew Tour

American skateboarders
2001 births
Living people
Sportspeople from Mesa, Arizona
X Games athletes
Skateboarders at the 2020 Summer Olympics
Medalists at the 2020 Summer Olympics
Olympic bronze medalists for the United States in skateboarding
Olympic skateboarders of the United States
21st-century American people